East Ridgley is a rural locality in the local government area (LGA) of Burnie in the North-west and west LGA region of Tasmania. The 2016 census recorded a population of 103 for the state suburb of East Ridgley.

History 
East Ridgley is a confirmed locality. 

It is believed that the name “Ridgley” was conferred by surveyor Henry Hellyer in the 1820s.

Geography
The Emu River forms the eastern boundary. The Pet River, a tributary of the Emu, forms most of the western boundary.

Road infrastructure 
Route B18 (Ridgley Highway) passes to the north-west. From there, Circular Road provides access to the locality.

References

Towns in Tasmania
Burnie, Tasmania